Scleroctenophora is an extinct class of ctenophore, known from the Chinese Maotianshan shales of Yunnan. It is dated to Cambrian Stage 3 and belongs to late Early Cambrian strata.  Scleroctenophorans are easily distinguished from other ctenophores by the presence of an internal skeleton that supports the body.

References

Prehistoric ctenophores
Maotianshan shales fossils